Graham Goode may refer to:

 Graham Goode (broadcaster), British horse racing commentator
 Graham Goode (racing driver), British racing driver